Maximilian Franzke (born 5 March 1999) is a German professional footballer who plays as a winger for 2. Bundesliga club 1. FC Magdeburg.

Career
Franzke joined FC St. Pauli in January 2020.

He signed for 3. Liga side 1. FC Magdeburg on loan in October 2020.

In summer 2021, he signed for 1. FC Magdeburg permanently on a contract of undisclosed length.

Career statistics

References

External links
 
 
 
 

Living people
1999 births
Footballers from Munich
Association football wingers
German footballers
FC Bayern Munich II players
FC St. Pauli players
FC St. Pauli II players
1. FC Magdeburg players
2. Bundesliga players
3. Liga players
Regionalliga players